Carlia mysi is a species of skink, commonly known as Mys' rainbow skink. It is endemic to Papua New Guinea and occurs in both mainland New Guinea and in the Bismarck Archipelago. Populations believed to be introduced exist in the Solomon Islands.

References

Carlia
Skinks of New Guinea
Reptiles of Papua New Guinea
Endemic fauna of Papua New Guinea
Reptiles described in 2004
Taxa named by George Robert Zug